Leroy Gerald Monsky, Sr. (April 12, 1916 – August 12, 1981) was an All-American football player.  

Monsky was born in Montgomery, Alabama, in 1916. He was an All-State football player at Sidney Lanier High School.  

After high school, Monsky enrolled at the University of Alabama where he played on the Crimson Tide football teams from 1935 to 1937.  He was selected as a consensus All-American in 1937 at the guard position.  He was the captain of the 1937 Alabama football team that played in the 1938 Rose Bowl.  Noted sports writer Grantland Rice said of Monsky: "Leroy Monsky, amazingly fast for his size and power, was outstanding on both offense and defense and was a key man in the Alabama attack which specializes in the use of the guards . . . led many a charge that put Alabama in front after a strenuous tussle. His fighting courage was the deciding factor in most of these games."  

Monsky was inducted into the Alabama Sports Hall of Fame in 1979.

After his football career ended, Monsky established a real estate business in Birmingham, Alabama. He died in New York City in 1981.

See also
 1937 College Football All-America Team

References

                   

1916 births
1981 deaths
All-American college football players
Players of American football from Montgomery, Alabama
American football guards
Alabama Crimson Tide football players
Jewish American sportspeople
20th-century American Jews